Veddel is a quarter (Stadtteil) in the Hamburg-Mitte borough of the Free and Hanseatic city of Hamburg on the homonymous island in the Elbe river, in northern Germany. In 2020, the population was 4,356.

History

Geography

Demographics
In 2006 in the Veddel quarter were living 4,944 people. Resident aliens were 51.1% of the population. 407 people were registered as unemployed.

In 1999 there were 2,106 households, out of which 30.5% had children under the age of 18 living with them and 40.9% of all households were made up of individuals. The average household size was 2.25.

Notes

References 

 Selectable database: Statistical office Hamburg and Schleswig-Holstein Statistisches Amt für Hamburg und Schleswig-Holstein.

External links

Quarters of Hamburg
Hamburg-Mitte
Islands of Hamburg